The 1988–89 Evansville Purple Aces men's basketball team represented the University of Evansville in the 1988–89 NCAA Division I men's basketball season. Their head coach was Jim Crews and they played their home games at the Ford Center as members of the Midwestern Collegiate Conference. After winning the MCC regular season championship, the Purple Aces received an at-large bid to the 1989 NCAA tournament. They defeated Oregon State in the opening round before losing to the eventual National runner-up, Seton Hall, in the second round.

Roster

Schedule

|-
!colspan=9 style=| Regular season

|-
!colspan=9 style=| MCC tournament

|-
!colspan=9 style=| NCAA tournament

Rankings

NBA draft

References

Evansville Purple Aces
Evansville Purple Aces men's basketball seasons
Evansville
Evans
Evans